William Worcester, also called William of Worcester, William Worcestre or William Botoner (1415) was an English topographer, antiquary and chronicler.

Life
He was a son of another William of Worcester, a Bristol whittawer (worker in white leather), and his wife Elizabeth,  Botoner. His mother was a daughter of Thomas Botoner from Coventry, and he sometimes used the surname Botoner.

He was educated at Oxford and became secretary to Sir John Fastolf. When Fastolf died in 1459, Worcester discovered  that he had bequeathed him nothing, despite his being one of Fastolf's executors, and, with one of his colleagues Sir William Yelverton, Worcester disputed the validity of the will. However, an amicable arrangement was made and Worcester obtained some lands near Norwich and in Southwark in London. He died about 1482.

Writings
Worcester made several journeys through England, and his notes (now known as his "Itineraries") contain much information. His survey of Bristol, which he appears to have devised as a self-contained work, is particularly detailed, and of great value to historians and antiquaries. Portions of his notes were printed by James Nasmith in 1778; and the description of Bristol was published by James Dallaway under the title William Wyrcestre Redivivus in 1823, and reprinted in his Antiquities of Bristowe in 1834. Modern scholarly editions and translations have been published as the Itineraries of William Worcestre in 1969, edited by John Harvey; and as The Topography of Medieval Bristol in 2000, edited by Frances Neale.

The Boke of Noblesse, written some time in the 1450s, was produced in the wake of disastrous English losses in France and was later revised with the apparent intention of encouraging King Edward IV to renew his claim on the French throne.

Worcester also wrote Annales rerum Anglicarum, a work of some value for the history of England under Henry VI. This was published by Thomas Hearne in 1728, and by Joseph Stevenson for the Rolls Series with his Letters and Papers illustrative of the Wars of the English in France during the Reign of Henry VI (1864). Stevenson also printed here collections of papers made by Worcester respecting the wars of the English in France and Normandy.

Worcester's other writings include the last Acta domini Johannis Fastolf. See the Paston Letters edited by James Gairdner (1904); and F. A. Gasquet, An Old English Bible and other Essays (1897).

Modern editions

References

Bibliography

Attribution:

1415 births
1482 deaths
15th-century English historians
Writers from Bristol
English chroniclers
English antiquarians
15th-century antiquarians
15th-century Latin writers